is a railway station on the Tazawako Line in Semboku, Akita, Japan, operated by East Japan Railway Company (JR East).

Lines
Tazawako Station is served by the Tazawako Line and the Akita Shinkansen, and is located 40.1 rail km from the terminus of both lines at Morioka Station.

Station layout
Tazawako Station consists of a single side platform and an island platform. The station building, by architect Shigeru Ban, with its glass facade, received the Good Design Prize. Tazawako Station was selected to be one of the Hundred Stations of Tohoku.

Platforms

History
The station was renamed to its present name on October 1, 1966. The station was absorbed into the JR East network upon the privatization of JNR on April 1, 1987. Services on the Akita Shinkansen began on March 22, 1997.

Surrounding area
 Nyūtō hot spring village
 Lake Tazawa 
 Semboku City Hall
 Sashimaki moor

External links

 JR East Station information 

Railway stations in Japan opened in 1923
Railway stations in Akita Prefecture
Akita Shinkansen
Tazawako Line